The Lisitsin Gambit is a chess opening characterised by the moves:
1. Nf3 f5
2. e4

History
The opening became widely known in 1931 when it was played (probably for the first time in official matches) by Georgy Lisitsin against Nikolai Riumin in their fight at Moscow for the first round of the USSR Chess Championship.

Theory
The Lisitsin Gambit is registered in Encyclopedia of Chess Openings under the code A04.

The gambit which alternatively can be transposed to the lines of Dutch Defence and is quite easy to learn these lines in relation to the lines of the Dutch Defence.

White can delay the gambit for one move, playing first 2.d3 wherein Black often continue with 2...d6, or any other move, depending on the variation of the Dutch which trying to apply. Then White can try here the gambit playing 3.e4. This variation is referred by some researchers as improved Lisitsin Gambit.

Black continuations
2. e4 is a very counter-intuitive move, as after the pawn is captured White does not get to make a developing move but must move an already developed piece again. However, practice has shown that the knight landing on g5 is hard to chase away and creates certain tactical threats (more than simply Nxe4!) that compensate for the lost pawn.

 2...e5 transposes to the notorious Latvian Gambit. This may actually be a good practical choice for someone who knows nothing about the Lisitsin, as it gives Black a greater initiative.
 2...fxe4 is the only way to challenge White's idea. Wilhelm Steinitz said "the way to refute a gambit is to accept it."

Central idea
If Black tries retaining an extra pawn at any cost, he might be punished, e.g.: 1.Nf3 f5 2.e4 fxe4 3.Ng5 d5 4.d3 exd3? (4...Nf6) 5.Bxd3 Nf6 6.Bxh7 Nxh7 7.Qh5+ Kd7 8.Nf7 Qe8? 9.Qxd5#

See also
List of chess openings
List of chess openings named after people

References

Chess openings